Magomed-Shapi Kamilyevich Suleymanov (born 16 December 1999) is a Russian professional  footballer who plays as a winger for Israeli club Hapoel Be'er Sheva on loan from Krasnodar. He is of Dargins origin.

Club career
He made his debut in the Russian Professional Football League for FC Krasnodar-2 on 12 March 2017 in a game against FC Angusht Nazran.

He made his debut in the Russian Premier League for FC Krasnodar on 16 July 2017 in a game against FC Rubin Kazan.

In his second main squad appearance on 27 July 2017 in an 2017–18 UEFA Europa League third qualifying round game against Lyngby he scored the winning goal in the 93rd minute, giving his team a 2–1 victory. He thus became the youngest Russian player ever to score in UEFA's club competitions (at the age of 17 years 7 months and 11 days), beating the mark set by Sergey Rodionov in 1980.

In his first appearance of the 2018–19 season on 26 August 2018 he scored his first Russian Premier League goal, an 88th-minute equalizer in a 1–1 away draw against FC Orenburg. In the next game on 1 September 2018, he scored another goal in added time, giving Krasnodar a 2–1 victory over the reigning champions FC Lokomotiv Moscow. He scored again, for the third time in four games on 24 September 2018 against FC Krylia Sovetov Samara.

On 21 February 2019, he scored a late free-kick goal that helped Krasnodar eliminate Bayer Leverkusen in the Europa League Round of 32 on the away-goals rule. On 14 March 2019, in the Round of 16 return leg, he scored a late goal once again, this time against Valencia, that would have qualified Krasnodar for the quarterfinal, but Valencia equalized with 30 seconds left in injury time and Krasnodar was eliminated. On 31 March 2019, he had his first Russian Premier League multi-goal game, scoring twice against his hometown club FC Anzhi Makhachkala in a 5–0 victory.

On 13 August 2019, with Krasnodar making its debut appearance in the Champions League qualifiers, he scored twice in a 3–2 away victory over FC Porto to help his club overcome the first leg 0–1 home loss and advance to the play-off round.

On 8 September 2021, Krasnodar announced his loan to Turkish club Giresunspor for the 2021–22 season.

He returned to Krasnodar in June 2022.

On 17 August 2022, Suleymanov joined Hapoel Be'er Sheva in Israel on a season-long loan with an option to buy.

Career statistics

Club

Honours

Individual
UEFA Youth League top assists: 2017–18

References

External links
 

1999 births
Footballers from Makhachkala
Living people
Dargwa people
Russian footballers
Association football wingers
Russia youth international footballers
Russia under-21 international footballers
FC Krasnodar players
FC Krasnodar-2 players
Giresunspor footballers
Hapoel Be'er Sheva F.C. players
Russian Premier League players
Russian First League players
Russian Second League players
Süper Lig players
Israeli Premier League players
Russian expatriate footballers
Expatriate footballers in Turkey
Russian expatriate sportspeople in Turkey
Expatriate footballers in Israel
Russian expatriate sportspeople in Israel